Power center may refer to:

Power center (geometry), the intersection point of the three radical axes of the pairs of circles

See also
Power station